Gunilla Elisabet Abrahamsson (born 22 June 1945 in Norrköping) is a Swedish actress. She studied at Gothenburg Theatre Academy.

Selected filmography
1994 – Rederiet (TV)
1994 – Kan du vissla Johanna? (TV film)
1998 – Beck – Monstret
1998 – Skärgårdsdoktorn (TV)
1999 – Vägen ut
2001 – Kaspar i Nudådalen (TV, Julkalendern)
2001 – Om inte
2002 – Stackars Tom (TV)
2002 – Stora teatern (TV)
2003 – En ö i havet (TV)
2004 – Om Stig Petrés hemlighet (TV)
2005 – 27 sekundmeter, snö (TV film)

External links

1945 births
Living people
People from Norrköping
Swedish television actresses